José Manuel Díaz Medina (born 2 July 1949) is a Mexican politician from the Institutional Revolutionary Party. From 2000 to 2003 he served as Deputy of the LVIII Legislature of the Mexican Congress representing Durango, having previously served in the Congress of Durango from 1998 to 2000.

References

1949 births
Living people
Politicians from Durango
Institutional Revolutionary Party politicians
21st-century Mexican politicians
Universidad Juárez del Estado de Durango alumni
Members of the Congress of Durango
Deputies of the LVIII Legislature of Mexico
Members of the Chamber of Deputies (Mexico) for Durango